Corpo Dourado (Summer Affair) is a Brazilian soap opera produced by and shown on TV Globo from 12 January 1998 through 21 August 1998. The 191 chapters were written by Antônio Calmon and directed by Flávio Colatrello Jr, and later Marcos Schetchman.

Synopsis

Selena farmer is a fiber young woman who does not rest while trying to extract a secret from her mother Camila: the identity of her father. But she also dreams of one day having the love of Chico, the commission agent of the coastal city of Marimbá. Only that it is complicated investigating a mysterious murder.
 
The two form a love triangle with Arturzinho, São Paulo entrepreneur of the branch of footwear. The stormy Amanda, who abandons Arturzinho at the altar to marry Chico, is the owner of the tannery that supplies the plant of shoes, and reluta in accepting the revelation of that Selena is his bastard sister. Breaching with Arturzinho's family, Amanda provokes the financial destruction of the shoe factory.
 
The crime shakes the family of Arturzinho still more: its father, Zé Paulo, are assassinated. One is uncovered then video ribbon where Zé Pablo asks for to the son to be married Selena and to save the finances of the family. Initially, Arturzinho and Selena if detestam. It sees it as "maricas", distant of its reality, while it considers it one "machona without education". E still: how Arturzinho goes to explain the situation for Alicinha, its case?

Despite the differences and the problems, Arturzinho and Selena they finish if involving, for desperation delegated it Chico, that was gotten passionate for the farmer, if moving away each time more from Amanda, who already displays serious psychological problems.

There is another love triangle, formed by Judy, her boyfriend Tadeu and Billy, the mysterious photographer who arrives at the folloied city of the Zeca son. Billy, whose character remains mysterious for all the tram, finishes up having an involvement with Amanda.

Cast
Detached the protagonists
Adriana Garambone - Soninha
Ana Rosa - Camila
André Ricardo - Duca
Antônio Petrin - Ezequiel
Bianca Byington - Diana
Carlos Vereza - Silveira / Colonel Tinoco
Cláudia Lira - Débora
Cristiana Oliveira - Selena
Daniel Ávila - Kris
Danielle Winits - Alicinha
Fábio Jr. - Billy
Felipe Camargo - Tadeu
Felipe Folgosi - Lucas/Mateus
Fernanda Rodrigues - Lígia
Flávio Galvão - Orlando
Gerson Brenner - Jorginho
Giovanna Antonelli - Judy
Hugo Carvana - Jacinto Azevedo
Humberto Martins - Chico
Isabel Fillardis - Noêmia
Java Mayan - Zeca
José de Abreu - Renato
Joyce Caldas - Ana
Lafayette Galvão - Epaminondas
Lucinha Lins - Hilda
Ludmila Dayer - Bibí
Lui Mendes - Nando
Mara Carvalho - Laís
Marcelo Faria - Guto
Marcos Winter - Arturzinho
Maria Gladys - Mazinha
Maria Luísa Mendonça - Amanda
Mônica Carvalho - Clara
Paulo Reis - Aderbal
Pedro Guaraná - Severino
Roberto Frota - Romão
Rosamaria Murtinho - Isabel
Sebastião Vasconcelos - Sérvulo
Thaís Caldas - Lana
Thaís Fersoza - Ritinha
Zezé Motta - Liana

Participation special
Lima Duarte - Zé Paulo
Luíza Curvo - Clara (child)
Zilka Salaberry - Celeste sister

Embroidery frames
In the opening the name of Cristiana Oliveira, was wrong credited as Cristiana "of" Oliveira.
The General Average was of 37 points, being satisfactory for the schedule.
track
Somente o Sol (Only the Sun) - Deborah Blando (opening subject)
Vivo por ella (Living creature for It) - Andrea Bocelli e Sandy

Soundtrack

National 
 Vivo Por Ella - Andrea Bocelli & Sandy
 Pra Te Ter Aqui - Netinho
 Coração Vazio - Michael Sullivan
 Pura Emoção (Achy Breaky Heart) - Chitãozinho e Xororó
 Somente o Sol (I'm Not in Love) - Deborah Blando
 Realidade Virtual - Cidade Negra
 Grama Verde - Adriana Maciel
 Choveu - Blitz
 Dois - Paulo Ricardo
 O Que Você Quer - Rita Lee
 Quase - Daúde
 Hanime - Ive
 Me Liga - Patrícia Marx
 Se Todos Fosssem Iguas a Você - Claudia Telles

International 
 I Will Come To You - Hanson
 My All - Mariah Carey
 Torn - Natalie Imbruglia
 Angels - Robbie Williams
 You Sexy Thing - T-shirt
 Secrets - Nicki French
 The Mummer's Dance - Loreena McKennitt
 How Do I Live - Debra Michaels
 Whenever I Call You Friend - Michael Johnson featuring Alison Krauss
 Ain't That Just The Way - Betsy Loop
 You're Still The One - Shania Twain
 Take Me As I Am - Faith Hill
 Say You'll Be Mine - La Bouche
 Breaking All The Rules - She Moves
 Sunshyme - Rising Sun
 Lonely - Stars And Strippers

References

External links
 Information about Golden Body

1998 telenovelas
1998 Brazilian television series debuts
1998 Brazilian television series endings
Brazilian telenovelas
TV Globo telenovelas
Portuguese-language telenovelas